Tanjung Berhala is a small port town in Terengganu, Malaysia.

References

Towns in Terengganu